The Best of DJ Quik: Da Finale is a greatest hits album by rapper and producer DJ Quik. The album charted at number 43 of Billboard's Top R&B/Hip-Hop Albums chart.

Track listing 

 (co.) Co-producer

References

DJ Quik albums
Albums produced by Courtney Branch
Albums produced by DJ Quik
Albums produced by G-One
2002 greatest hits albums